Wolfstein is a former Verbandsgemeinde ("collective municipality") in the district of Kusel, Rhineland-Palatinate, Germany. The seat of the Verbandsgemeinde was in Wolfstein. On 1 July 2014 it merged into the new Verbandsgemeinde Lauterecken-Wolfstein.

The Verbandsgemeinde Wolfstein consisted of the following Ortsgemeinden ("local municipalities"):

 Aschbach
 Einöllen
 Eßweiler
 Hefersweiler
 Hinzweiler
 Jettenbach
 Kreimbach-Kaulbach
 Nußbach
 Oberweiler im Tal
 Oberweiler-Tiefenbach
 Reipoltskirchen
 Relsberg
 Rothselberg
 Rutsweiler an der Lauter
 Wolfstein

External links
Official website

Former Verbandsgemeinden in Rhineland-Palatinate